Luke Leahy (born 19 November 1992) is an English footballer, who plays as a defender or midfielder for Shrewsbury Town. He started his career at Rugby Town and signed for Falkirk in 2012, where he played for five seasons.

Club career
Leahy began his career with Rugby Town, affiliated with the Gordon Strachan Football Foundation.

Falkirk
He signed for Falkirk in the summer of 2012, after trials with Birmingham City, Bradford City and Peterborough United.

He was signed by Steven Pressley originally as an attacking midfielder, despite the fact he had played left-back for Rugby Town the previous season. He made his first team début in the Scottish Challenge Cup against Stirling Albion on 28 July 2012. His league debut came in September against Cowdenbeath at Central Park as a substitute in the 72nd minute of the game. On 10 November 2012, he scored his first goal for The Bairns against Raith Rovers at Stark's Park. However, he would only go on to make three further appearances that season; two of which were from the bench.

Leahy continued to be a peripheral figure under Gary Holt as he struggled to stake a claim for a place in the side; on 7 September 2013, he was even listed as the substitute goalkeeper for Falkirk in their Scottish Challenge Cup Quarter Final against Raith Rovers, as Falkirk didn't have a third choice keeper to put on the bench. He made 23 appearances in all competitions in season 2013/14, most of which were from the bench, and managed a solitary goal; an injury time equaliser against Dundee at Dens Park.

Peter Houston became Falkirk manager in the summer of 2014, just after Leahy had signed a new two-year contract extension. Houston was the first manager to give Leahy a chance to hold down a place in the side. He was on the bench for the first four league games of season 2014/15, but started the 1–1 draw with Queen of the South on 13 September 2014 at left-back, and has since made the position his own. Leahy made 41 appearances in all competitions; he also started the 2015 Scottish Cup Final for Falkirk against Inverness Caledonian Thistle, which they lost 2–1. He continued to be a mainstay in the Falkirk team that had a fantastic season finishing 2nd in the 2015/16 Scottish Championship, making 46 appearances across all competitions. On 22 August 2015, he scored what would go on to be voted Falkirk's goal of the season in a 2–1 win against Livingston at Almondvale. On 19 February 2016, Leahy penned a one-year extension with Falkirk, keeping him at the club until the summer of 2017. Leahy left the Bairns in May 2017, following the expiration of his contract.

Bristol Rovers
He was released by Walsall at the end of the 2018–19 season. On 9 July 2019, Leahy joined League One side Bristol Rovers. He made his debut for the club on 3 August 2019, in an opening 2–0 defeat away at Blackpool. He scored his first goal for the club on 10 November 2019, opening the scoring at the back-post in a 1–1 draw with Bromley in the FA Cup first round.

Leahy scored his first league goal for Rovers on the opening day of the 2020–21, converting a penalty in a 1–1 draw away at Sunderland. With the appointment of Rovers' third manager of the season Joey Barton, Leahy was made captain of the club as Max Ehmer lost his armband. On 10 April 2021, Leahy scored his tenth goal of the season to open the scoring in a vital relegation six-pointer against Northampton Town, a game in which Rovers would go on to draw 1–1. Leahy was out of contract at the end of the 2020–21 season, a season that saw Rovers relegated bottom of the league. Despite an offer of a new contract from the club, Leahy opted to leave instead.

Shrewsbury Town
On 17 May 2021, Leahy agreed to join Shrewsbury Town, signing a two-year contract from 1 July 2021.

Career statistics

Honours
Individual
EFL League One Player of the Month: January 2023

References

External links
 

1992 births
Living people
Footballers from Coventry
English footballers
Association football fullbacks
Rugby Town F.C. players
Falkirk F.C. players
Walsall F.C. players
Bristol Rovers F.C. players
Shrewsbury Town F.C. players
Southern Football League players
Scottish Football League players
Scottish Professional Football League players
English Football League players